Igor Sapała (born 11 October 1995) is a Polish professional footballer who plays as a midfielder for Polish club Wisła Kraków.

Club career
At the age of 6-7, he started playing in the junior teams of Polonia Warsaw. On loan to Żyrardowianka Żyrardów July 1, 2014.On February 1, 2015 he was loaned to Bzura Chodaków.On July 8, 2015, after short tests, he signed a contract with Dolcan Ząbki.He made his debut for the team on August 1, 2015 in the match I liga against MKP Pogoń Siedlce.He scored the team's first goal in a league match against Zagłębie Sosnowiec on 31 October 2015.March 3, 2016 signed a contract with Piast Gliwice.He made his debut for the club on 8 May 2016 in a match of Ekstraklasa against Legia Warsaw.He scored his first goal for his club on 11 December 2016 in a 1–5 league match against Legia Warsaw.On 8 February 2017, he was loaned to GKS Katowice for six months.He made his debut for the team on 10 March 2017 against Stomil Olsztyn.On loan for one year to Raków Częstochowa on 25 July 2017.He made his club debut on 6 August 2017 in a league match against Puszcza Niepołomice.After the loan expired Sapała immediately signed a new contract with Raków Częstochowa.On September 22, 2018, during a league match with Warta Poznań, he fell on the ball and suffered a hand injury, which was a fracture of two forearm bones, with splinters and dislocations.Sapała signed a contract with Wisła Kraków until the end of June 2025 on 13 December.

International career
Sapała was called up to the Poland U20 in 2016. He made his debut on March 23, 2016 against Italy U20.

Career statistics

Honours
Raków Częstochowa
Polish Cup: 2020–21, 2021–22
Polish Super Cup: 2022

References

External links
 
 
 Footballdatabase Profile

Polish footballers
1995 births
Living people
Ekstraklasa players
I liga players
III liga players
Ząbkovia Ząbki players
Piast Gliwice players
GKS Katowice players
Polonia Warsaw players
Raków Częstochowa players
Wisła Kraków players
Association football midfielders
People from Kartuzy
Poland youth international footballers